The 2014 BNP Paribas Masters was a professional men's tennis tournament played on indoor hard courts. It was the 42nd edition of the tournament, and part of the 2014 ATP World Tour. It took place at the Palais omnisports de Paris-Bercy in Paris, France, between 28 October and 2 November 2014. First-seeded Novak Djokovic won the singles title.

Points and prize money

Point distribution

Prize money

Singles main-draw entrants

Seeds

 1 Rankings are as of 20 October 2014

Other entrants
The following players received wildcards into the singles main draw:
  Pierre-Hugues Herbert
  Adrian Mannarino
  Édouard Roger-Vasselin

The following player received entry as a special exempt:
  David Goffin

The following player received entry using a protected ranking into the singles main draw:
  Jürgen Melzer

The following players received entry from the qualifying draw:
  Kenny de Schepper
  Denis Istomin
  Lucas Pouille
  Sam Querrey
  Jack Sock
  Donald Young

Withdrawals
Before the tournament
  Nicolás Almagro (foot injury) → replaced by  Pablo Cuevas
  Marin Čilić (arm injury) → replaced by  Vasek Pospisil
  Juan Martín del Potro (wrist injury) → replaced by  João Sousa
  Ernests Gulbis (shoulder injury) → replaced by  Jerzy Janowicz
  Rafael Nadal (appendectomy) → replaced by  Pablo Andújar

Retirements
  Denis Istomin (right leg injury)
  Leonardo Mayer (back injury)

Doubles main-draw entrants

Seeds

 Rankings are as of 20 October 2014

Other entrants
The following pairs received wildcards into the doubles main draw:
  Jérémy Chardy /  Kenny de Schepper
  Pierre-Hugues Herbert /  Nicolas Mahut
The following pair received entry as alternates:
  Pablo Cuevas /  Santiago Giraldo

Withdrawals
Before the tournament
  Leonardo Mayer (back injury)
During the tournament
  Ivan Dodig (back injury)
  Sam Querrey (elbow injury)

Finals

Singles

  Novak Djokovic defeated  Milos Raonic, 6–2, 6–3

Doubles

  Bob Bryan /  Mike Bryan defeated  Marcin Matkowski /  Jürgen Melzer, 7–6(7–5), 5–7, [10–6]

References

External links
 Official website
 ATP tournament profile